La Patata is the thirteenth regular studio album by European-American pop group The Kelly Family, released by KEL-Life Records in April 2002 throughout most of Europe. It was the band's first new release since From Their Hearts in October 1998 and marked the departure of original band members Kathy and John Kelly. In 2002 and 2003 The Kelly Family toured Europe to promote the album.

Track listing

Charts

References

External links
 KellyFamily.de — official site

2002 albums